The Makelaria Monastery is a 6th-century Eastern Orthodox monastery located in the Peloponnese, Greece. It lies on a big rock near the villages of Lapanagoi, at a distance of 30 km from the town of Kalavryta. The monastery, one of the oldest in Greece, was founded in 532 AD and is dedicated to the Dormition of the Theotokos

External links
Official website of the Municipality of Kalavryta with information about the history of Makelaria Monastery (In Greek)
 Monasteries of Kalavryta (in English)

Monasteries in Western Greece
Christian monasteries established in the 6th century
Buildings and structures in Achaea
Religion in Western Greece
Byzantine monasteries in Greece